Revelation is the sixth studio album released by Australian singer-songwriter Peter Andre.

Background
Following a further three years away from the music industry, Andre had been quietly writing and recording new material. Andre was offered a recording contract with Conehead Management following the success of his ITV2 fly-on-the-wall documentary, Peter Andre: The Next Chapter. Andre began recording with Conehead in January 2009. On 9 August 2009, "Behind Closed Doors" was revealed as the first single from Andre's upcoming album. The track was co-written by Andre, AC Burrell and Francesca Richard. "Unconditional" was revealed as the second and final single from the album, due for release on 9 November 2009. However, the track had already charted on the UK Singles Chart, following promotion and download sales. Upon the physical release, the track peaked at #50, Andre's second lowest charting single to date. The video for the track premiered on The Box on 16 October 2009. The album itself was released on 19 September 2009, peaking at #3 on the UK Albums Chart, and selling more than 300,000 copies to be certified platinum. The album's track listing was confirmed via Play.com on 14 August 2009.

Track listing

Charts

Weekly charts

Year-end charts

Certifications

References

2009 albums
Peter Andre albums